Tarsier Studios is a Swedish video game developer based in Malmö.

History 
Nine developers, including Andreas Johnsson and Björn Sunesson, founded Tarsier Studios in 2004. Johnsson had been a traditional programmer in the 1990s but wished to get into video game programming. With many Swedish universities beginning to offer game development courses, he enrolled at a Karlshamn university, where he got together with the other developers who would found Tarsier Studios. Their puzzle-platform game Tio won a game design contest panelled by video game industry veterans, which landed the team a spot in an incubation programme that would provide aid to advance the game's concept. The team was given an office space but no financial assistance. Mattias Nygren joined Tarsier as its chief executive officer (CEO) in 2006 and the business foundation of the Sparbanken i Karlshamn acquired a significant stake in the studio. They reworked Tio into The City of Metronome and attended E3 2005 to pitch the game to publishers. The team attracted interest from companies including Sony Computer Entertainment but ultimately signed no publishing deal. Tarsier remained in business with work-for-hire projects while working on further prototypes. One physics-based fighting game prototype again attracted the interest of Sony, which hired the team to develop a remake of Rag Doll Kung Fu. This sparked the start of a longer partnership with Sony, with Tarsier creating art assets and later downloadable content packs for LittleBigPlanet. In July 2010, Tarsier signed an exclusivity deal with Sony.

During this time, the team grew to 30 people and moved from Karlshamn to Malmö. The Karlshamn office was retained for continued outsourcing operations, while the Malmö office would house the development of console games. A "super-ambitious" game Tarsier was working on for Sony was put on hold when the studio was offered to develop LittleBigPlanet PS Vita. In June 2013, Nygren bought out the Karlshamn location, saying that it was not feasible for Tariser to operate two locations at a time. He left Tarsier and installed Ola Holmdahl as its new CEO of the 40-person Malmö studio. Out of the Karlshamn office, Nygren established The Station. Tarsier's next bigger project was the horror game Hunger. The studio initially pitched the game to Sony, but the publisher had much higher ambitions for external projects and declined. Tarsier instead found a publisher in Bandai Namco Entertainment, which invested in the project with the intent of producing multiple games. The deal was announced in August 2016 and Hunger was renamed Little Nightmares. For Sony, Tarsier created the virtual reality game Statik, and the studio worked with Nintendo on The Stretchers.

Being part of a larger company meant that the studio had better financing and no longer needed to seek external publishers. The transition also brought along staff changes: Tarsier hired Oliver Merlöv, formerly of Massive Entertainment, as its chief operating officer in 2020, as well as Erik Rudelius as its chief people and culture officer. As of 2022, only three of the nine original founders remain with the company.

Games

Cancelled 
 The City of Metronome

References

External links 
 

2004 establishments in Sweden
2019 mergers and acquisitions
Companies based in Malmö
Embracer Group
Swedish companies established in 2004
Video game companies established in 2004
Video game companies of Sweden
Video game development companies